Pedro Gil Barros Silva (4 July 1991, in Lordelo – ? in Paredes) known as Gil Barros, is a Portuguese footballer who plays for C.F. União as a defender.

Football career
On 27 July 2013, Barros made his professional debut with União Madeira in a 2013–14 Taça da Liga match against Trofense, when he started and played the full game.

References

External links

Stats and profile at LPFP 

1991 births
Living people
Portuguese footballers
Association football defenders
Liga Portugal 2 players
C.F. União players